Presidential elections were held in Peru in 1919. Augusto B. Leguía was elected with 62% of the vote.

Results

References

Presidential elections in Peru
Peru
1919 in Peru
Election and referendum articles with incomplete results